Mahesh Muthuswami is an Indian cinematographer working in Tamil, Telugu and Hindi films.

Filmography

Career 
Upon his graduation from Film and Television Institute of India , Pune,  he started working with legendary cinematographer P. C. Sreeram. With him he worked in features - Kushi (Telugu), Vaanam Vasappadum (Tamil) . He worked with ace cinematographer Ramji in Sandhya, a Hindi film.

His diploma short film, Chaitra directed by Kranti Kanade was the official student Oscar entry in the year 2002.

His first film was Rightaa Thappaa for director, producer Bhuvana. The film went on to win two State Awards.

His second feature Chithiram Pesuthadi,was Mysskin's directorial debut. It became a hit owing to the unique style the film was written in.

Post Chithiram Pesuthadi, he shot the Hindi Film Risk starring Randeep Hooda, Vinod Khanna and Tanushree Dutta for director Vishram Sawant.
 
Then he teamed up with director Mysskin again shooting Anjaathey and Nandalala for him.  Anjathey was a runaway commercial success.

Nandalala got him the Best Cinematographer award for the year 2010 from the reputed and popular Tamil weekly magazine Ananda Vikatan.

In 2009 he did camerawork for a Hindi 3D Animation Feature film, Alibaba & 41 Thieves, produced by UTV Motion Pictures and directed by Soumitra Ranade.

In his next feature Vamsam  he teamed up with director Pandiraj . It was the debut film for actor Arulnidhi .

His next release was Mouna Guru which had Arulnidhi and Iniya in lead roles for debutant director Shantakumar.

It was a brooding, crime thriller and went on to earn raving reviews.

His first Telugu film, Jabardasth, was with Director Nandini Reddy.  Jabardast had leads played by Siddharth, Samantha and Nithya Menen.

Kutti Puli directed by debutant director Muthaiah had Director, Actor Sasikumar as lead. The film was commercially a huge success.

Idharkuthane Aasaipattai Balakumara, directed by Gokul , featuring Vijay Sethupathi, as lead was his next. 

In the year 2022 , he started shooting his 25th Feature Film ' Habeebi ' for Dir Meera Kathiravan

He also teaches Cinematography at BOFTA,  Chennai ( Blue Ocean Film and Television Academy )  http://www.bofta.in/faculty-masters.php since 2015 and finds the experience very refreshing..

Early life and family 
Mahesh Muthuswami was born in Palani, Tamil Nadu, India. to R. Muthuswami and P. Vijayalakshmi, Rtd HOD of Government Arts College, Dindigul. His maternal uncle was his first inspiration for his visual media. He completed his schooling from MSP Solai Nadar Memorial Higher Secondary school, Dindigul and graduation in Mechanical Engineering from PSG College of Technology, Coimbatore. Then he got placed in Bajaj Auto, Pune. During his college days he further developed his interest in Photography from his close friend Muthuselvan. That passion made him to leave Bajaj and join FTII, Pune to pursue a course in Cinematography. He is married to Manimalar,  who is a Graphic Designer and an educational professional. She is currently the CCA Head for the four branches of San Academy group of schools, Pallikaranai. They have a daughter named Sanchitha.

Awards and scholarships

 Best Cinematographer Award 2010 for the film Nandalala from the Tamil magazine Ananda Vikatan
 Jagdish Batra Memorial Scholarship for the year 2004 from FTII, Pune (Most deserving & best student in Final Diploma Exam in Cinematography)
 Phalke Memorial Honour 2nd Prize for the year 2004 from FTII, Pune (Second best student in Final Diploma Exam)

References 
Life Through the Lens
Taking A Different Angle
 Anjaathey Review
 Vamsam Review
 Mounaguru Review
 Jabardasth Review
 Kutti Puli Review
 Oru Kuppai Kathai Review

External links
 www.maheshmuthuswami.com 
 
Mahesh Muthuswami work account on Instagram
Mahesh Muthuswami original account on Instagram
Facebook Page on Mahesh Muthuswami
Article on Makeup for SICA
Lecture for PSG Tech Alumni Association Chennai Chapter

Cinematographers from Tamil Nadu
People from Dindigul district
Year of birth missing (living people)
Living people
Film and Television Institute of India alumni
Tamil film cinematographers
Indian cinematographers